Kuttankulangara is a ward (Ward No. 2) of Thrissur Municipal Corporation situated in the north-west side of the Corporation. It is a residential area with only a few institutions of importance. Kuttankulangara Sri Krishna Temple is located in this ward.

See also
 List of Thrissur Corporation wards

References

Suburbs of Thrissur city